Garo, Colorado is a former populated place in South Park in Park County, Colorado, United States.

Description

The community was named after its founder, the area ranchers Marie Guiraud, and for her late husband, Louis Adolfe Guiraud, both natives of France.

Notable people
 Cleo Spurlock Wallace

See also

 List of ghost towns in Colorado

References

External links

 ePodunk Community Profile for Garo, Colorado

Ghost towns in Colorado
Former populated places in Park County, Colorado